Forrest Mandeville (born April 29, 1984) is an American politician who served in the Montana House of Representatives for the 57th district from 2015 to 2021.

References

1984 births
Living people
Republican Party members of the Montana House of Representatives
21st-century American politicians
People from Columbus, Montana